The 1976 Tampa Bay Rowdies indoor season was the second indoor season of the club's existence. The Rowdies were able to replicate their 1975 outdoor success by winning the North American Soccer League's 1976 indoor championship.

Club

Roster

Management and technical staff
 George Strawbridge, Jr., owner
 Beau Rogers, general manager
 Eddie Firmani, head coach
 Chas Serednesky, business manager
 Francisco Marcos, director of public relations
 Mike Dolan and Stan Taylor, trainers
 John Kauzlarich, team physician
 Alfredo Beronda, equipment manager

Honors
NASL Indoor Tournament: Champions
NASL Indoor, Eastern Regional: Regional champions
International Cup: Champions (friendly)

Individual honors
Tournament MVP: Clyde Best (Tournament totals: 4 games, 7 goals, 4 assists)
All-Tournament Team: Clyde Best, Stewart Scullion, Derek Smethurst
Regional MVP: Stewart Scullion (Regional totals: 2 games, 3 goals, 1 assist)
All-Regional Team: Stewart Scullion, Rodney Marsh, Arsene Auguste

Review
The Tampa Bay Rowdies were the runners-up of the 1975 NASL Indoor tournament in March, and the winners of Soccer Bowl '75 in August, both held California at the home venues of the San Jose Earthquakes. In October 1975 the NASL announced that the Bayfront Center would host both the 1976 Indoor Eastern Regionals and Final Four. It was later announced that Tampa Bay would also play a pre-tournament international friendly at the Bayfront Center. This meant that all of the Rowdies indoor matches for 1976 would be played at home.

Friendlies
Billed in media reports as an International Challenge Cup Match, Tampa Bay’s first game was a pre-tournament international friendly versus Santos F.C. of Jamaica, and  played on March 6 at the Bayfront Center. The Rowdies easily defeated their guests, who were playing indoor soccer for the very first time, by the score of 11–4.

Eastern Regionals
The winner of the Eastern Regional would gain an automatic place in the Final Four.
In their first tournament game the Rowdies battled back from a 4–1 deficit midway through the second period, to score eight straight goals and defeat Washington, 9–5. The following evening Tampa Bay had a much easier time in defeating the Boston Minutemen, 5–3, as they dictated play until the final minutes, when Boston scored two meaningless late goals. Those two victories left the Rowdies as the only undefeated team in the group, and therefore champions of their region for the second straight year. Stewart Scullion was named Regional MVP, with Rodney Marsh and Arsene Auguste joining him on the All-Regional squad.

Regional standings

Final Four
In the semifinal Tampa Bay held a slim, one-goal lead in the third period over the Dallas Tornado. With less than three minutes remaining the Rowdies broke open the match the by scoring three straight goals in a span of 81 seconds to defeated Dallas, 6–2, and earn their second straight trip to the indoor finals.

On March 27, 1976, the Tampa Bay Rowdies played in their third championship final out of three total competitions in their brief history. This time they would face surprise finalists Rochester Lancers. Unfortunately for Rochester, goalkeeper Jim May was severely injured late in their semi-final upset win over San Jose, and could not play in the final. The Rowdies were without Rodney Marsh for the contest, as he suffered a head injury in the semi-final. In a closely fought match Tampa Bay prevailed, 6–4, on three goals by Derek Smethurst, two by Clyde Best, and one by Mark Lindsay. Smethurst’s game winning, third goal came with 3:18 left in the match. Best was named tournament MVP, with Smethurst and Stewart Scullion joining him on the All-Tournament squad.

Bracket

Championship standings

Match reports

Statistics

Scoring
GP = Games Played, G = Goals (worth 2 points), A = Assists (worth 1 point), Pts = Points

Goalkeeping
Note: GP = Games played; Min = Minutes played; GA = Goals against; GAA = Goals against average; W = Wins; L = Losses

Player movement

See also

 1976 team indoor stats

References

1976 indoor
Tampa Bay Rowdies (1975–1993) seasons
Tampa Bay Rowdies
Tampa Bay Rowdies
Tampa Bay Rowdies
Tampa Bay Rowdies